Jon Martin Olof Jönsson (born 8 July 1983) is a Swedish former footballer who played as a defender.

Career
Jönsson made his first team debut in IFK Hässleholm aged 15, and his talent was recognised by Tottenham Hotspur who brought him to London. In return IFK Hässleholm received roughly £70,000 and two players to play one season on loan, Alton Thelwell and Peter Crouch.

Jönsson started his career as an offensive midfielder, but in the beginning of 2006 was retrained as a central defender. He adapted very well to his new position, and was voted the best central defender in Allsvenskan in 2006, by the managers of Allsvenskan. At the end of the year he was also included in the Swedish national team squad, but an injury prevented him playing.

In June 2007 Jönsson agreed a contract with Ligue 1 team Toulouse FC. He left the club after only one season because he struggled to get a place on the first team. He signed a four-year contract with Danish club Brøndby IF on 26 June 2008. Jönsson left Brøndby on 18 June 2010, after having signed a -year contract with IF Elfsborg.

He retired from professional football in 2019.

Honours

Malmö FF
 Allsvenskan: 2004

IF Elfsborg
 Allsvenskan: 2006, 2012

References

External links

Living people
1983 births
People from Hässleholm Municipality
Association football defenders
Swedish footballers
Sweden youth international footballers
Sweden under-21 international footballers
Landskrona BoIS players
Malmö FF players
IF Elfsborg players
Toulouse FC players
Brøndby IF players
Allsvenskan players
Danish Superliga players
Swedish expatriate footballers
Swedish expatriate sportspeople in England
Expatriate footballers in France
Expatriate men's footballers in Denmark
Swedish expatriate sportspeople in France
Swedish expatriate sportspeople in Denmark
Footballers from Skåne County